A shopping list is a list of items needed to be purchased by a shopper.  Consumers often compile a shopping list of groceries to purchase on the next visit to the grocery store (a grocery list).  The shopping list was known 2000 years B.C. in ancient Mesopotamia. There are surviving examples of Roman and Biblical shopping lists.

The shopping list itself may be simply a scrap piece of paper or something more elaborate.  There are pads with magnets for keeping an incremental list available at the home, typically on the refrigerator, but any magnetic clip with scraps of paper can be used to achieve the same result.  There is even a specific device that dispenses a strip of paper from a roll for use in a shopping list. Some shopping carts come with a small clipboard to fit shopping lists on.

Psychology 
Use of shopping lists may be correlated to personality types.  There are "demographic differences between list and non list shoppers; the former are more likely to be female, while the latter are more likely to be childless."  Remembering a shopping list is a standard experiment in psychology.  Shopping with a list is a commonly employed behavioral weight loss guideline designed to reduce food purchases and therefore food consumption.  Studies are divided on the effectiveness of this technique.

Some studies show approximately 40% of grocery shoppers use shopping lists, while other studies show 61–67% use lists. Of the items listed, 80% were purchased.  However, listed items only accounted for 40% of total items purchased. Use of shopping lists clearly impact shopping behaviour: "Written shopping lists significantly reduce average expenditure."

Incremental lists 
The list may be compiled immediately before the shopping trip or incrementally as shopping needs arise throughout the week.  Incremental lists typically have no structure and new items are added to the bottom of the list as they come up.   If the list is compiled immediately before use, it can be organized by store layout (e.g. frozen foods are grouped together on the list) to minimize time in the store.  Preprinted lists can be similarly organized.

See also 

 Checklist, a job aid used for repetitive tasks or procedures
 To do list, a list or "backlog" of pending tasks

References

Shopping (activity)